Pelargonium vitifolium is a species of geranium known by the common name grapeleaf geranium. It is native to South Africa, and it is a commonly grown ornamental plant. This is a mostly erect, branching shrub approaching one meter in maximum height. The stems are soft and coated in soft hairs when young and become more woody with age. The glandular, stiffly-hairy aromatic leaves are about 6 centimeters long and 8 wide, divided into 5 or 7 toothed, heart-shaped lobes. The inflorescence is a dense umbel of several flowers with five petals each around a centimeter long. The flowers are pink with purplish markings.

External links
Jepson Manual Treatment
Photo gallery

vitifolium
Garden plants
Flora of South Africa